Glenn Elliott Alexander (born June 3, 1947) is a former professional American football wide receiver in the National Football League. He attended Grambling State University and played with the Buffalo Bills in 1970.

External links
Pro-Football reference

1947 births
Living people
People from New Orleans
Players of American football from Louisiana
Buffalo Bills players
Grambling State Tigers football players